St Lawrence's Church at Stratford-sub-Castle is a Grade I listed Church of England parish church, to the north of Salisbury, Wiltshire, England.

History
The date of the foundation of this church is uncertain, and it is first mentioned as a chapel annexed to St Martin's at Salisbury. The church was said to have been consecrated in 1326 but this could have been a rebuilt church, replacing an earlier one on the site. There is a 12th-century font, but it is possible that this could have been brought from elsewhere. It is most probable that much of the stone came from the abandoned buildings at Old Sarum. Some features of the chancel are of the 13th century, and there were alterations and repairs in the 15th century; from this period comes the waggon roof, with its interesting carved bosses, probably of 1461.

The nave was probably largely rebuilt in the 16th century and in 1711 the tower was rebuilt, most likely as a copy of the late medieval one. The building was restored in 1904–1905 under the direction of W. D. Caroe, and more repairs were carried out in 1926. Electric lighting was provided in 1948, and there was a further restoration in 1957–1958. There are many pre-Victorian fittings, with an oak chancel screen of the 15th or early 16th century and many other internal fittings of the early 18th century.

In 1553 there were three bells, but one was sold in 1584. In 1998, another of the original bells was sold and five new bells hung, retaining the last original bell (dated 1594) as the treble, making a ring of six.

The parish registers date from 1654, and those not in current use are held in the Wiltshire and Swindon History Centre at Chippenham.

The church was designated as Grade I listed in 1972.

A section of the churchyard contains graves of 52 service personnel of World War I and World War II that are looked after by the Commonwealth War Graves Commission. Most from the former war (47) were from local war hospitals, and around half of those are Australian soldiers.

References

Sources 
 Wiltshire community history – Wiltshire Council. Accessed March 2023.
 St Lawrence Church at Stratford-sub-Castle community site. Accessed March 2023.

External links 
 
 

Salisbury
Churches in Salisbury
Grade I listed churches in Wiltshire